Keng L. Siau is an academic working as the chair of the Department of Business and Information Technology at the Missouri University of Science and Technology.

Education 
Siau earned a Bachelor of Science degree in computer science and Master of Science in information science from the National University of Singapore. He earned a Doctor of Business Administration from the University of British Columbia in 1996.

Career 
Siau worked as the head of the Department of Information Systems and Chair Professor of Information Systems at the City University of Hong Kong. At the University of Nebraska–Lincoln, he was the Edwin J. Faulkner Chair Professor and a full professor of management. He joined the Missouri University of Science and Technology in June 2012 and has since worked as chair of the university's Department of Business and Information Technology. Siau is editor-in-chief of the Journal of Database Management.

References 

Living people
National University of Singapore alumni
University of British Columbia alumni
Academic staff of the City University of Hong Kong
University of Nebraska–Lincoln faculty
Missouri University of Science and Technology faculty
Year of birth missing (living people)